Miles & Quincy: Live at Montreux is a collaborative live album by American jazz trumpeter Miles Davis and conductor Quincy Jones. It was recorded at the 1991 Montreux Jazz Festival and released by Warner Bros. Records in 1993.

Miles & Quincy: Live at Montreux charted at number one on the Billboard Top Jazz Albums. It won Davis his seventh Grammy Award for Best Large Jazz Ensemble Performance.

Background 
Miles Davis, who had never revisited past music from his career before, surprised jazz fans when he worked with an ensemble led by Quincy Jones at the Montreux Jazz Festival on July 8, 1991. 
Quincy had persuaded Miles to play his older music after they met with a psychic at Quincy’s home in New York. The psychic’s dice had fallen into Miles’ lap and they interpreted this as a sign that it was right for him to play his older music. The concert was also a tribute to Gil Evans who had died a few years before. Jones developed the idea of using two orchestras and conducted both the Gil Evans Orchestra and George Gruntz Concert Jazz Band at the concert. The performance also featured guest instrumentalists who played with Davis, including trumpeters Benny Bailey and Wallace Roney, drummer Grady Tate, bassist Carles Benavent, and alto saxophonist Kenny Garrett. Davis was seriously ill when he played the concert, and it was the final album he recorded before his death three months later.

Critical reception 

In a contemporary review for Entertainment Weekly,  critic David Hajdu gave the album an "A" and said that it is "simply the most exquisite music of tragedy this side of a New Orleans funeral. Don't be mistaken though: This ain't no party. Nor is it a career-summing work of miraculous late-life virtuosity. It's something even rarer: an almost unbearably honest musical expression, without apology or shame, of weakness, age, and pain." Q magazine found the sound thin, but funky and strong. In a less enthusiastic review for Vibe magazine, Greg Tate found Davis' playing occasionally sketchy and felt that the recreations are not on-par with Evans' original arrangements: "[T]he compressed nature of this document—even its shadowy relationship to the original—only serves to highlight the nova-like luminosity of Gil and Miles's work together."

In a retrospective review, Allmusic's Ron Wynn wrote that "not every moment is golden, but the overall session ranks just a bit below the majestic '50s and '60s dates featuring Davis' trumpet and Evans' arrangements." In The Penguin Guide to Jazz, Richard Cook and Brian Morton said that the exaggerated arrangements are redeemed by the audience's enraptured reception and Davis' musical ideas, if not his labored solos: "Jones hails Miles Davis as a 'great painter' and that is exactly what he was. He left some masterpieces, some puzzling abstracts, and a pile of fascinating sketches."

Track listing

Personnel 
Musicians
 Miles Davis - trumpet
 Quincy Jones - conductor
 Kenny Garrett - alto saxophone
 Wallace Roney - trumpet, flugelhorn

 The Gil Evans Orchestra
 Lew Soloff - trumpet
 Miles Evans - trumpet
 Tom Malone - trombone
 Alex Foster - alto and soprano saxophones, flute
 George Adams - tenor saxophone, flute
 Gil Goldstein - keyboards
 Delmar Brown - keyboards
 Kenwood Dennard - percussion

 The George Gruntz Concert Jazz Band
 Marvin Stamm - trumpet, flugelhorn
 John D’Earth - trumpet, flugelhorn
 Jack Walrath - trumpet, flugelhorn
 John Clark - French horn
 Tom Varner - French horn
 Dave Bargeron - euphonium, trombone
 Earl McIntyre - euphonium, trombone
 Dave Taylor - bass trombone
 Howard Johnson - tuba, baritone saxophone
 Sal Giorgianni - alto saxophone
 Bob Malach - tenor saxophone, flute, clarinet
 Larry Schneider - tenor saxophone, oboe, flute, clarinet
 Jerry Bergonzi - tenor saxophone
 George Gruntz  -piano
 Mike Richmond - double bass
 John Riley - percussion
 Additional musicians to George Gruntz Concert Jazz Band
 Manfred Schoof - trumpet, flugelhorn
 Ack Van Rooyen - trumpet, flugelhorn
 Alex Brofsky - French horn
 Roland Dahinden - trombone
 Claudio Pontiggia - French horn
 Anne O’Brien - flute
 Julian Cawdry - flute
 Hanspeter Frehner - flute
 Michel Weber - clarinet
 Christian Gavillet - bass clarinet, baritone saxophone
 Tilman Zahn - oboe
 Dave Seghezzo - oboe
 Xavier Duss - oboe
 Judith Wenziker - oboe
 Christian Raabe - bassoon
 Reiner Erb - bassoon
 Xenia Schindler - harp
 Conrad Herwig - trombone
 Roger Rosenberg - bass clarinet, baritone saxophone
 Other additional musicians
 Benny Bailey - trumpet, flugelhorn
 Carles Benavent - double bass, electric bass on "The Pan Piper" and "Solea"
 Grady Tate - drums

Production
 Quincy Jones - producer
 Jerry Hey - associate  producer
 Claude Nobs - executive producer
 Louise Velazquez - executive producer
 Jolie Levine  - production coordinator
 Jeff Gold - art direction
 Jeri Heiden - art direction
 John Heiden - design
 Annie Leibovitz  - photography
 Philippe Dutoit  - photography

Charts

Certifications and sales

See also 
 The Complete Miles Davis at Montreux
 Miles! The Definitive Miles Davis At Montreux Dvd Collection

References

External links 
 

1993 live albums
Albums arranged by Quincy Jones
Albums recorded at the Montreux Jazz Festival
Grammy Award for Best Large Jazz Ensemble Album
Miles Davis live albums
Quincy Jones live albums
Warner Records live albums